Off-white refers to any color that is a close variation of white. 

Off-White (company), a clothing brand founded by Virgil Abloh
 Off White, a 1979 album by  James White and the Blacks